American International School of Johannesburg (AISJ) is a pre-K to 12 (pre-school to senior high school) American international school system with two campuses in South Africa, in Johannesburg and Pretoria. It was founded in 1982.

The Pretoria campus, which serves pre-K to 8, opened in August 2002. The original Pretoria campus was located close to the U.S. Embassy. In 2010, the school purchased the current Pretoria site.

Its mascot is an eagle.

References

External links

 American International School of Johannesburg

Johannesburg
International schools in Johannesburg
International schools in Pretoria
High schools in South Africa
Educational institutions established in 1982
1982 establishments in South Africa